Minya Csaba Gál (born Cluj-Napoca, 7 March 1985) is a Romanian rugby union footballer. He plays a centre.

Gál first played at U Cluj, moving to Dinamo Bucharest, in 2004. He currently plays for CSM Baia Mare. He also plays internationally for București Oaks in the European Challenge Cup.

He was selected for the Romania squad that played at the 2007 Rugby World Cup. The Romanian centre played in three matches during the competition. He also competed at the 2011 Rugby World Cup.

Gál has currently 88 caps for Romania, with 3 tries and 1 conversion scored, 17 points on aggregate. He scored his first try in the decisive 2011 Rugby World Cup Final Place Play-off against Uruguay, on 27 November 2010 (won 39–12).

Since June 2021, Gal is the current president of U Cluj Rugby, which plays in the Romanian SuperLiga.

References

External links
Minya Csaba Gal at the 2007 Rugby World Cup Official Site
Minya Csaba Gál International Statistics

1985 births
Living people
Romanian rugby union players
Rugby union centres
Romanian sportspeople of Hungarian descent
Romania international rugby union players
CSM Știința Baia Mare players
București Wolves players
CS Universitatea Cluj-Napoca (rugby union) players
Sportspeople from Cluj-Napoca